Reece A. Caudle (June 16, 1888 – June 21, 1955) was an American politician. He was a member of the Arkansas House of Representatives, serving from 1923 to 1928. He was a member of the Democratic party.

References

1955 deaths
1888 births
People from Pope County, Arkansas
20th-century American politicians
Speakers of the Arkansas House of Representatives
Democratic Party members of the Arkansas House of Representatives